Events occurred in 1767 in Denmark.

Incumbents
 Monarch – Christian VII
 Prime minister –  Count Johann Hartwig Ernst von Bernstorff

Events

 1 May  * Anointing of Christian VII and Queen Caroline Mathilde at Christiansborg Palace.

Unated
 Nykøbing Castle is sold at auction and demolished. The bricks were used to build numerous estates and rectories in different parts of Falster. All that remains of the castle is a stump of wall from the Medieval prison tower known as Fars Hat (Father's Hat).

Births
 9 February – Gottfried Becker, pharmacist and industrialist (died 1845)
 27 December  Peter Leonhard Gianelli, medallist (died 1807)

Deaths
24 June – Johan Henrik Freithoff, violinist and composer (born 1713).
 10 July – Oluf Blach, merchant and ship-owner (born 1694)
 1 September – Carl Juel, statesman, councillor, and diocesan governor (born 1706)

References

 
1760s in Denmark
Denmark
Years of the 18th century in Denmark